Vipera tigrina may refer to:

 Vipera dinniki, a venomous viper species found in Russia, Georgia and Azerbaijan
 Bothrops lanceolatus, a venomous pitviper species found on the island of Martinique